yakala.co is a Turkish group buying website founded in 2010.
A subsidiary of Hürriyet, the site specializes in offering daily deals in 6 major cities. yakala.co is currently ranked within the first 500 Turkish websites by Alexa.

In 2010, the company was awarded two Golden Mixx awards by the Turkish leg of Interactive Advertising Bureau (IAB).

Yaka.co website ceased its activities as of December 16th, 2022.

References
 Alexa Top 500 sites in Turkey

External links
yakala.co Official website
 Interview with founding partner Mehmet Keteloğlu (Turkish)
 Awards won by the company (Turkish)

Online retailers of Turkey